Kim Jin-sun (Korean: 김진선, hanja: 金振兟; born November 10, 1946) is a former governor of Gangwon Province, South Korea, and former president of the Pyeongchang 2018 Olympic Organizing Committee for the 2018 Winter Olympics which was held in Pyeongchang, South Korea.

He resigned from the top post of the POCOG in July 2014 only nine months after being reelected, although his current temp should have expired as late as in October 2015.

References

1946 births
2018 Winter Olympics
2018 Winter Paralympics
Governors of Gangwon Province
Living people
People from Gangwon Province, South Korea
Presidents of the Organising Committees for the Olympic Games
South Korean Buddhists